Petalioi  is an island complex in south-east of Euboea, in the homonymous gulf. It consists of 10 small islands and islets almost all uninhabited. The total area of the complex is 22.5 square kilometers. They belong to Karystos municipality, in Marmari municipal unit. The islands of the complex are: Megalonisos, Chersonisi, Avgo, Lamperousa, Louloudi, Makronisi, Pontikoniso, Praso, Tragos and Founti. The largest of them is Megalonisos. It has an area of 17 Km2 and is uninhabited. The most of them are private islands and belong to Greek shipowners.

History
The name Petalioi derives from Petalios, the name of the largest island Megalonisos in antiquity. In modern times the islands were a property of Greek royal family. In 1915 or 1916, the prince George II sold the islands to Greek shipowner Maris Empeirikos.

References

Archipelagoes of Greece
Landforms of Euboea (regional unit)
Landforms of Central Greece